Rainey Qualley (born March 11, 1989) is an American actress and singer. The daughter of actress Andie MacDowell and sister of actress Margaret Qualley, she made her acting debut in the 2012 film Mighty Fine. She is best known for her music, which she releases under the name Rainsford.

Early life
Rainey Qualley was born March 11, 1989, in New York City but was raised in North Carolina. She is the daughter of actress and model Andie MacDowell, and model, musician, contractor, and rancher Paul Qualley. She has two siblings: an older brother, Justin and a younger sister, actress and model Margaret Qualley.

Career
Qualley made her debut as Miss Golden Globe in 2012. That same year, she starred in Mighty Fine, opposite her mother Andie MacDowell, directed by Debbie Goodstein. In 2014, Qualley starred in Falcon Song directed by Jason Corgan Brown. In 2015, Qualley guest starred in an episode of Mad Men. In 2018, Qualley starred in Perfect directed by Eddie Alcazar. She made a cameo appearance as herself in Ocean's 8. Qualley will next star in The Shuroo Process directed by Emrhys Cooper.

Qualley releases and writes music under the name Rainsford.

In 2016, she released the song "Too Close". In 2017, she released the song "Rendezvous". In 2018, Rainsford released her debut extended play Emotional Support Animal. In 2019, Rainsford released two songs, "Passionate" and "Open Open". In 2020, Rainsford released two songs, "2 Cents" and "Crying in the Mirror". Rainsford collaborated with Twin Shadow on two songs on his fourth studio album.

Filmography

Film

Television

Discography

EPs
 Turn Down the Lights (2015)
 Emotional Support Animal (2018)

Singles
 "Me and Johnny Cash" (2015)
 "Too Close" (2016)
 "Rendezvous" (2017)
 "Somewhere Else" (2018)
 "Passionate" (2019)
 "Open Open" (2019)
 "2 Cents" (2020)
 "Crying in the Mirror" (2020)
 "Oh My God" (2020)
 "Love Me Like You Hate Me" (2020)

Guest appearances

References

External links
 

21st-century American actresses
21st-century American singers
Actresses from New York City
Actresses from North Carolina
American film actresses
American television actresses
Living people
People from Asheville, North Carolina
American women songwriters
American women pop singers
American indie pop musicians
21st-century American women singers
1990 births